Mes Educational System or simply "Mes" is an educational system in public schools of the Far Western Region of Nepal.
In this system students spend their day time activities in a public school with other non residential students. After school hours the students return to the residential halls which provide food and individualized tuition service. Such students are charged additional for such service in addition to the regular tuition school fees. The tuition service include subjects of the students weakness mostly English, Mathematics and Science. The Mes is run by teachers from public schools or Principal themselves.

The program was first started by  Megh Raj Rosyara at Pravat Ma. Vi. Dehimandu. The system is supposed to be local adoption of Boarding school system in large cities. Now the system is popular all over Doti and Dadeldhura.

References

Education in Nepal